This is a list of distinguished members of Phi Mu Alpha Sinfonia fraternity who have achieved significant recognition in their respective fields, including (but not limited to) education, film, industry, literature, music, philanthropy, public service, radio, science, and television.

In determining the classification for each Sinfonian listed here, an attempt was made to classify the individual based on what he is most known for. In some cases, a person such as Aaron Copland may be known equally as a conductor and a composer. In other cases, an individual such as Branford Marsalis may be known equally as a jazz musician and a television personality.

Honorary members are in italics, charter members are in bold.

"Big band" leaders

Businessmen and philanthropists

Composers

Band/winds

Choral/vocal

Film/TV

Post-romantic

Other

Conductors

Band/winds

Choral

Symphonic

Television

Educational administrators

Folk singers

Government leaders

Instrumentalists

Miscellaneous

Organists

Other

Pianists

Trumpeters

Saxophonists

Violinists

Jazz artists

Music critics and editors

Music educators

Musicologists

Peace activists

Radio, film and television personalities

Rock and/or pop musicians

Scientists and scholars
 Capt. Winston Scott, 1950–present (Epsilon Iota 1970); member of the Space Shuttle Endeavour crew; Senior Vice President for External Relations and Economic Development, Florida Institute of Technology)

Visual artists
 Thomas Hart Benton (Alpha Psi Honorary 1947)

Vocalists

References

 
Phi Mu Alpha Sinfonia